The following is a list of the municipalities (comuni) of Umbria, Italy.

There are 92 municipalities in Umbria (as of January 2019):

59 in the Province of Perugia
33 in the Province of Terni

List

See also
List of municipalities of Italy

References

 
Geography of Umbria
Umbria